Antygomonas is a genus of cyclorhagids. It is the only genus in the family Antygomonidae Adrianov & Malakhov, 1994. Species of Antygomonas are commonly referred to as "mud dragons."

Species
Antygomonas incomitata Nebelsick, 1990
Antygomonas oreas Bauer-Nebelsick, 1996
Antygomonas paulae Sørensen, 2007

References

Further reading
Müller, M. & Schmidt-Rhaesa, A. (2003). Reconstruction of the muscle system in Antygomonas sp. (Kinorhyncha, Cyclorhagida) by means of phalloidin labeling and cLSM. Journal of Morphology, 265(2), 103–110.
Sørensen, M., Accogli, G. & Hansen, J. (2010). Postembryonic development of Antygomonas incomitata (Kinorhyncha: Cyclorhagida). Journal of Morphological, 271(7), 863–882.

External links
WORMS entry for Antygomonidae
ITIS entry for Antygomonidae

Kinorhyncha
Ecdysozoa genera